Ady Berber (4 February 1913 – 3 January 1966) was an Austrian film actor, professional wrestler and café owner. He appeared in more than 40 films between 1936 and 1966. He was born and died in Vienna, Austria.

Selected filmography

 Court Theatre (1936) - Heurigensänger
 I Am Sebastian Ott (1939) - Meinhardt, Ganove
 Donauschiffer (1940)
 Der Herr Kanzleirat (1948) - Krautstoffel 
 Season in Salzburg (1952) - Sepp, Gärtner
 Knall and Fall as Imposters (1952) - Bademeister
 The White Horse Inn (1952) - Luggage porter at 'Weisses Rössl' (uncredited)
 To Be Without Worries (1953) - Wachmann Nestroy
 Die Nacht ohne Moral (1953)
 Die fünf Karnickel (1953) - Franz 
 Carnival Story (1954) - Groppo
 Marianne of My Youth (1955) - Diener
 Lola Montès (1955) - Bulgakov (uncredited)
 ...und wer küßt mich? (1956) - Boxer
 Almenrausch und Edelweiß (1957) - Masseur (uncredited)
 A Thousand Stars Aglitter (1959) - Marko
 Ben Hur (1959) - Malluch (uncredited)
 Peter Voss, Hero of the Day (1959) - Leslie aus Texas
 Mein Schatz, komm mit ans blaue Meer (1959) - Glatzköpfiger Schläger (uncredited)
  (1960) - Adi
 Das Dorf ohne Moral (1960) - 'Tiger-Hai', Chef des "Tabarin"
 The Dead Eyes of London (1961) - Jacob "Der blinde Jack" Farrell 
 The Secret Ways (1961) - Sandor
 The Return of Doctor Mabuse (1961) - Alberto Sandro
  (1961)
 The Door with Seven Locks (1962) - Peter Cawler / Giacco
 The Gypsy Baron (1962) - Ein Schatzgräber
 The Black Cobra (1963) - Punkti
 Die Nylonschlinge (1963) - Henry 
 The Indian Scarf (1963) - Chiko
 Scotland Yard Hunts Dr. Mabuse (1963) - Hangman
 Im singenden Rößl am Königssee (1963) - Harald
 Our Crazy Aunts in the South Seas (1964) - Medizinmann Wudu-Budu
 Frühstück mit dem Tod (1964) - Ernie, Leibwächter von Adama
  (1964) - Lode Van Dijk
 Hotel der toten Gäste (1965) - Hoteldiener Teddy
 Tausend Takte Übermut (1965) - Hausdiener
 Diamonds Are Brittle (1965) - Max
 The Murderer with the Silk Scarf (1966) - Kriminalinspektor Stenzel 
 The Strangler of the Tower (1966) - Strangler

References

External links

1913 births
1966 deaths
Austrian male film actors
Austrian male professional wrestlers
Male actors from Vienna
20th-century Austrian male actors